Saint Liberata may refer to:
The French name for Saint Wilgefortis
One of the sisters of St. Marina of Aguas Santas
Italian name for Saint Adele, daughter of King Dagobert II
Saint Liberata (Como), the sister of Saint Faustina, 6th century foundress of that town's convent
Saint Liberata (Pizzone), the patron saint of Pizzone, Italy